Pingasa lariaria is a moth of the family Geometridae first described by Francis Walker in 1860. It is found in Yunnan, China.

References

Moths described in 1860
Pseudoterpnini